The bat fauna of the Caribbean region is diverse.

For the purposes of this article, the "Caribbean" includes all islands in the Caribbean Sea (except for small islets close to the mainland) and the Bahamas, Turks and Caicos Islands, and Barbados, which are not in the Caribbean Sea but biogeographically belong to the same Caribbean bioregion.

Overview
The genera of Caribbean bats are classified as follows:
Order Chiroptera
Family Emballonuridae
Subfamily Emballonurinae: Diclidurus, Peropteryx, Rhynchonycteris, Saccopteryx
Family Furipteridae: Furipterus
Family Molossidae
Subfamily Molossinae: Cynomops, Eumops, Molossus, Mormopterus, Nyctinomops, Promops, Tadarida
Family Mormoopidae: Mormoops, Pteronotus
Family Natalidae: Chilonatalus, Natalus, Nyctiellus
Family Noctilionidae: Noctilio
Family Phyllostomidae
Subfamily Brachyphyllinae: Brachyphylla
Subfamily Carolliinae: Carollia
Subfamily Desmodontinae: Desmodus, Diaemus
Subfamily Glossophaginae
Tribe Glossophagini: Anoura, Glossophaga, Monophyllus
Subfamily Phyllonycterinae: Erophylla, Phyllonycteris
Subfamily Phyllostominae: Glyphonycteris, Lampronycteris, Lonchorhina, Lophostoma, Macrotus, Micronycteris, Mimon, Phyllostomus, Tonatia, Trachops, Trinycteris, Vampyrum
Subfamily Stenodermatinae
Tribe Stenodermatini: Ametrida, Ardops, Ariteus, Artibeus, Centurio, Chiroderma, Cubanycteris, Mesophylla, Phyllops, Platyrrhinus, Stenoderma, Uroderma, Vampyrodes
Tribe Sturnirini: Sturnira
Family Thyropteridae: Thyroptera
Family Vespertilionidae
Subfamily Antrozoinae: Antrozous
Subfamily Myotinae: Myotis
Subfamily Vespertilioninae
Tribe Eptesicini: Eptesicus
Tribe Lasiurini: Lasiurus
Tribe Nycticeiini: Nycticeius, Rhogeessa

Greater Antilles and associated islands
The four islands of the Greater Antilles, Cuba, Hispaniola, Jamaica, and Puerto Rico, and the surrounding smaller islands are home to a diverse indigenous bat fauna.

Cuba
Cuba, the largest of the Antilles, and its surrounding islands, of which the Isla de la Juventud is the most significant, harbor a diverse bat fauna.
Antrozous pallidus
†Artibeus anthonyi
Artibeus jamaicensis
Brachyphylla nana
Chilonatalus micropus
†Cubanycteris silvai
†Desmodus rotundus (=puntajudensis syn.)
Eptesicus fuscus
Erophylla sezekorni
Eumops ferox (formerly included in E. glaucinus)
Eumops perotis
Lasiurus insularis (formerly included in L. intermedius)
Lasiurus pfeifferi (formerly included in L. borealis)
Macrotus waterhousii
Molossus molossus
Monophyllus redmani
Mormoops blainvillei
†Mormoops magna
Mormoops megalophylla (extirpated)
Mormopterus minutus
Natalus primus
Noctilio leporinus
Nycticeius cubanus (formerly included in N. humeralis)
Nyctiellus lepidus
Nyctinomops laticaudatus
Nyctinomops macrotis
Phyllonycteris poeyi
Phyllops falcatus (also Coco, Paredón Grande, Sabana-Camagüey Archipelago)
†Phyllops silvai
†Phyllops vetus
Pteronotus macleayii
Pteronotus parnellii
†Pteronotus pristinus
Pteronotus quadridens
Tadarida brasiliensis

Isla de la Juventud
Isla de la Juventud is a large island south of Cuba and politically part of it.
Artibeus jamaicensis
Brachyphylla nana
Chilonatalus micropus
Eptesicus fuscus
Erophylla sezekorni
Lasiurus insularis
Macrotus waterhousii
Molossus molossus
Monophyllus redmani
Natalus primus (extirpated)
Noctilio leporinus
Nyctiellus lepidus
Phyllonycteris poeyi
Phyllops falcatus (extirpated)
†Phyllops vetus
Pteronotus macleayii
Tadarida brasiliensis

Grand Cayman
Grand Cayman is the largest of the Cayman Islands, a group of British islands west of Jamaica and south of Cuba.
Artibeus jamaicensis
Brachyphylla nana
Chilonatalus micropus (extirpated)
Eptesicus fuscus
Erophylla sezekorni
Macrotus waterhousii
Molossus molossus
Monophyllus redmani (extirpated)
Natalus cf. major (extirpated)
Phyllops falcatus
Pteronotus parnellii (extirpated)
Tadarida brasiliensis

Little Cayman
Little Cayman, also part of the Cayman Islands, is located east of Grand Cayman and just west of Cayman Brac.
Artibeus jamaicensis
Macrotus waterhousii

Cayman Brac
Cayman Brac is the easternmost of the Cayman Islands.
Artibeus jamaicensis
Brachyphylla nana (extirpated)
Eptesicus fuscus
Erophylla sezekorni
Macrotus waterhousii
Molossus molossus
Phyllonycteris poeyi (extirpated)
Phyllops falcatus

Jamaica
Ariteus flavescens
Artibeus jamaicensis
Brachyphylla nana (extirpated)
Chilonatalus micropus
Eptesicus lynni (often included in E. fuscus)
Erophylla sezekorni
Eumops auripendulus
Eumops ferox (formerly included in E. glaucinus)
Glossophaga soricina
Lasiurus degelidus (formerly included in L. borealis)
Macrotus waterhousii
Molossus molossus
Monophyllus redmani
Mormoops blainvillei
Mormoops megalophylla (extirpated)
Natalus jamaicensis
Noctilio leporinus
Nyctinomops macrotis
Phyllonycteris aphylla
Pteronotus macleayii
Pteronotus parnellii
Pteronotus quadridens
Tadarida brasiliensis
Tonatia saurophila (extirpated)

Navassa Island
Navassa Island is a small U.S. island between Jamaica and Hispaniola.
Macrotus waterhousii

Hispaniola
Hispaniola, the second largest of the Antilles, is politically divided into Haiti and the Dominican Republic. Various bats are known from both the main island and several surrounding islands, including Gonâve Island.
Artibeus jamaicensis
Brachyphylla nana
Chilonatalus micropus
Eptesicus fuscus
Erophylla bombifrons
Lasiurus minor (formerly included in L. borealis)
Macrotus waterhousii (also Beata Island)
Molossus molossus
Monophyllus redmani
Mormoops blainvillei
Mormoops megalophylla (extirpated)
Natalus major
Noctilio leporinus
Nyctinomops macrotis
Phyllonycteris poeyi
Phyllops falcatus
Pteronotus parnellii
Pteronotus quadridens
Tadarida brasiliensis

Gonâve
Gonâve Island is an island off western Haiti.
Artibeus jamaicensis
Macrotus waterhousii (extirpated)
Molossus molossus
Monophyllus redmani (extirpated)
Mormoops blainvillei (extirpated)
Pteronotus parnellii (extirpated)

Puerto Rico
Several bats are known from Puerto Rico, the easternmost of the Greater Antilles, which is under United States sovereignty.
Artibeus jamaicensis (incl. Mona and Caja de Muertos)
Brachyphylla cavernarum
Eptesicus fuscus
Erophylla bombifrons
Lasiurus minor
Macrotus waterhousii (extirpated)
Molossus molossus (also Culebra)
Monophyllus plethodon (extirpated)
Monophyllus redmani
Mormoops blainvillei
Noctilio leporinus
†Phyllonycteris major
Pteronotus parnellii
Pteronotus quadridens
Stenoderma rufum
Tadarida brasiliensis

Leeward Islands
The Leeward Islands form the northern segment of the Lesser Antilles.

U.S. Virgin Islands
The United States Virgin Islands are a group of islands east of Puerto Rico, centered around the three main islands of Saint Thomas, Saint John and Saint Croix.

St. Croix
Brachyphylla cavernarum
Molossus molossus
Noctilio leporinus
Stenoderma rufum

St. Thomas
Brachyphylla cavernarum
Molossus molossus
Noctilio leporinus
Stenoderma rufum

St. John
Brachyphylla cavernarum
Molossus molossus
Stenoderma rufum
Tadarida brasiliensis
Noctilio leporinus

British Virgin Islands
Artibeus jamaicensis
Brachyphylla cavernarum (Norman Island)
Molossus molossus (Tortola, Virgin Gorda)
Noctilio leporinus
Tadarida brasiliensis

Anguilla
Anguilla is a British island.
Artibeus jamaicensis
Brachyphylla cavernarum
Macrotus waterhousii (extirpated)
Molossus molossus
Monophyllus plethodon
Mormoops blainvillei (extirpated)
Natalus stramineus
Noctilio leporinus

Saint Martin
The island of Saint Martin is divided into a French and a Dutch part.
Ardops nichollsi
Artibeus jamaicensis
Brachyphylla cavernarum
Molossus molossus
Monophyllus plethodon
Myotis nesopolus (probably accidental)
Natalus stramineus (possibly extirpated)
Noctilio leporinus
Tadarida brasiliensis

Saint Barthelemy
Artibeus jamaicensis
Brachyphylla cavernarum
Molossus molossus
Monophyllus plethodon
Tadarida brasiliensis

Saba
Ardops nichollsi
Artibeus jamaicensis
Brachyphylla cavernarum
Molossus molossus
Monophyllus plethodon
Natalus stramineus
Tadarida brasiliensis

Sint Eustatius
Sint Eustatius is a small island near Saint Kitts that is part of the Netherlands.
Ardops nichollsi
Artibeus jamaicensis
Brachyphylla cavernarum
Molossus molossus
Tadarida brasiliensis

Saint Kitts
Saint Kitts forms the nation of Saint Kitts and Nevis together with nearby Nevis.
Ardops nichollsi
Artibeus jamaicensis
Artibeus schwartzi
Brachyphylla cavernarum
Molossus molossus
Monophyllus plethodon
Noctilio leporinus
Tadarida brasiliensis

Nevis
Nevis is the second main island of Saint Kitts and Nevis.
Ardops nichollsi
Artibeus jamaicensis
Artibeus schwartzi
Brachyphylla cavernarum
Molossus molossus
Monophyllus plethodon
Natalus stramineus
Noctilio leporinus
Tadarida brasiliensis

Antigua
Antigua forms Antigua and Barbuda together with Barbuda.
Artibeus jamaicensis
Brachyphylla cavernarum
Molossus molossus
Monophyllus plethodon
Mormoops blainvillei (extirpated)
Natalus stramineus
Noctilio leporinus
Phyllonycteris major (extinct)
Pteronotus parnellii (extirpated)
Tadarida brasiliensis

Barbuda
Barbuda is the other main island of Antigua and Barbuda.
Artibeus jamaicensis
Brachyphylla cavernarum
Macrotus waterhousii
Molossus molossus
Monophyllus plethodon
Mormoops blainvillei (extirpated)
Natalus stramineus
Noctilio leporinus
Tadarida brasiliensis

Montserrat
Montserrat is a small British island.
Ardops nichollsi
Artibeus jamaicensis
Artibeus schwartzi
Brachyphylla cavernarum
Chiroderma improvisum
Molossus molossus
Monophyllus plethodon
Myotis nigricans (unconfirmed record)
Natalus stramineus
Noctilio leporinus
Sturnira thomasi
Tadarida brasiliensis

Guadeloupe
The double island of Guadeloupe, which consists of two parts separated only by a narrow channel, is the core of the French overseas department of Guadeloupe.
Ardops nichollsi
Artibeus jamaicensis
Brachyphylla cavernarum
Chiroderma improvisum
Eptesicus guadeloupensis
Molossus molossus
Monophyllus plethodon
Myotis dominicensis
Natalus stramineus
Noctilio leporinus
Sturnira thomasi
Tadarida brasiliensis

La Désirade
La Désirade is a small island east of Guadeloupe.
Artibeus jamaicensis
Brachyphylla cavernarum
Molossus molossus
Tadarida brasiliensis

Marie Galante
Marie Galante is a smaller island that politically belongs to nearby Guadeloupe.
Artibeus jamaicensis
Brachyphylla cavernarum
Molossus molossus
Natalus stramineus
Pteronotus davyi

Dominica
Dominica, the southernmost of the Leeward Islands, is an independent state.
Ardops nichollsi
Artibeus jamaicensis
Brachyphylla cavernarum
Eptesicus fuscus
Molossus molossus
Monophyllus plethodon
Myotis dominicensis
Natalus stramineus
Noctilio leporinus
Pteronotus davyi
Sturnira lilium
Tadarida brasiliensis

Windward Islands
The bat fauna of the Windward Islands is more diverse than that of the Leeward Islands, reflecting the islands' location closer to the South American mainland.

Martinique
Martinique is a French overseas department.
Ardops nichollsi
Artibeus jamaicensis
Brachyphylla cavernarum
Molossus molossus
Monophyllus plethodon
Myotis martiniquensis
Natalus stramineus
Noctilio leporinus
Pteronotus davyi
Sturnira lilium
Tadarida brasiliensis

Saint Lucia
The island of Saint Lucia is an independent state.
Ardops nichollsi
Artibeus jamaicensis
Artibeus lituratus
Artibeus schwartzi
Brachyphylla cavernarum
Molossus molossus
Monophyllus plethodon
Noctilio leporinus
Sturnira lilium
Tadarida brasiliensis

Saint Vincent
Saint Vincent and the Grenadines is an independent state, composed of the main island of Saint Vincent and the northern portion of the Grenadines.
Ardops nichollsi (?)
Artibeus jamaicensis
Artibeus lituratus (?)
Artibeus planirostris
Artibeus schwartzi
Brachyphylla cavernarum
Glossophaga longirostris
Micronycteris megalotis (?)
Molossus molossus
Monophyllus plethodon (?)
Noctilio leporinus
Pteronotus parnellii
Sturnira lilium
Tadarida brasiliensis

Grenadines
Artibeus jamaicensis (Carriacou)
Artibeus planirostris (Carriacou)
Artibeus schwartzi (Carriacou)
Glossophaga longirostris (Union Mustique, Carriacou, Baquia)
Molossus molossus
Noctilio leporinus

Grenada
The island of Grenada, the southernmost of the main island chain of the Lesser Antilles, is part of an independent state that also comprises the southern Grenadines, including Carriacou.
Anoura geoffroyi
Artibeus glaucus
Artibeus jamaicensis
Artibeus lituratus
Artibeus planirostris
Artibeus schwartzi
Carollia perspicillata (probably in error)
Glossophaga longirostris
Glossophaga soricina
Micronycteris megalotis
Molossus molossus
Myotis nyctor
Noctilio leporinus
Peropteryx trinitatis
Pteronotus davyi
Sturnira lilium

Barbados
Barbados lies east of the main island chain of the Lesser Antilles.
Artibeus jamaicensis
Artibeus lituratus
Artibeus schwartzi
Brachyphylla cavernarum
Eptesicus fuscus
Molossus molossus
Monophyllus plethodon
Myotis nyctor
Noctilio leporinus
Tadarida brasiliensis

Trinidad
Trinidad, the larger island of Trinidad and Tobago, is close to mainland Venezuela and as a result has a very diverse bat fauna, including over 60 species, more than on any other Caribbean island, including much larger islands such as Cuba and Hispaniola.
Ametrida centurio
Anoura geoffroyi
Artibeus glaucus
Artibeus lituratus
Artibeus planirostris
Artibeus schwartzi
Carollia brevicauda
Carollia perspicillata
Centurio senex
Chiroderma trinitatum
Chiroderma villosum
Choeroniscus minor
Cynomops greenhalli
Desmodus rotundus
Diaemus youngi
Diclidurus albus
Enchisthenes hartii
Eptesicus brasiliensis
Eumops auripendulus
Furipterus horrens
Glossophaga longirostris
Glossophaga soricina
Glyphonycteris daviesi
Glyphonycteris sylvestris
Lampronycteris brachyotis
Lasiurus blossevillii
Lasiurus ega
Lonchorhina aurita
Lophostoma brasiliense
Mesophylla macconnelli
Micronycteris hirsuta
Micronycteris megalotis
Micronycteris minuta
Mimon crenulatum
Molossus molossus
Molossus rufus
Molossus sinaloae
Mormoops megalophylla
Myotis keaysi
Myotis nigricans
Myotis pilosatibialis
Myotis riparius
Natalus tumidirostris
Noctilio leporinus
Nyctinomops laticaudatus
Peropteryx trinitatis
Phyllostomus discolor
Phyllostomus hastatus
Platyrrhinus helleri
Promops centralis
Promops nasutus
Pteronotus davyi
Pteronotus parnellii
Pteronotus personatus
Rhogeessa io
Rhynchonycteris naso
Saccopteryx bilineata
Saccopteryx leptura
Sturnira lilium
Sturnira tildae
Thyroptera tricolor
Tonatia saurophila
Trachops cirrhosus
Trinycteris nicefori
Uroderma bilobatum
Vampyrodes caraccioli
Vampyrum spectrum

Tobago
Tobago is the smaller of the main islands of Trinidad and Tobago, located to the northeast of Trinidad.
Artibeus glaucus
Artibeus lituratus
Artibeus planirostris
Carollia perspicillata
Centurio senex
Chiroderma villosum
Eptesicus brasiliensis
Glossophaga longirostris
Micronycteris megalotis
Molossus molossus
Myotis attenboroughi
Natalus tumidirostris
Noctilio leporinus
Peropteryx trinitatis
Phyllostomus hastatus

Rhogeessa io
Saccopteryx bilineata
Saccopteryx leptura
Sturnira lilium
Tadarida brasiliensis
Vampyrodes caraccioli

ABC islands
The ABC islands are three islands off northwestern Venezuela that are part of the Kingdom of the Netherlands.

Bonaire
Bonaire is the easternmost of the ABC islands.
Ametrida centurio
Glossophaga longirostris
Leptonycteris curasoae
Molossus molossus
Mormoops megalophylla
Myotis nesopolus
Natalus tumidirostris

Curaçao
Curaçao is the largest of the ABC islands.
Artibeus jamaicensis (possibly vagrant or extirpated)
Glossophaga longirostris
Leptonycteris curasoae
Molossus molossus (possibly extirpated)
Mormoops megalophylla
Myotis nesopolus
Natalus tumidirostris
Noctilio leporinus
Pteronotus davyi

Aruba
Aruba is the smallest of the ABC islands and the closest to the mainland.
Artibeus jamaicensis
Glossophaga longirostris
Leptonycteris curasoae
Molossus molossus
Mormoops megalophylla
Myotis nesopolus (maybe)
Natalus tumidirostris
Noctilio leporinus
Peropteryx trinitatis
Pteronotus davyi
Sturnira lilium
Tadarida brasiliensis

Miscellaneous

Florida Keys
The Florida Keys are a group of islands near the Florida mainland.
Artibeus jamaicensis
Molossus molossus
Phyllonycteris poeyi (unconfirmed sight record)
Phyllops falcatus (Key West, possibly vagrant)
Tadarida brasiliensis (unconfirmed record)

Bahamas
The Bahamas are a large archipelago north of Cuba and east of Florida.
Artibeus jamaicensis (Mayaguana, Great Inagua)
Brachyphylla nana (extirpated; Andros, New Providence)
Chilonatalus tumidifrons (Andros; extirpated on Abaco, Exuma, New Providence)
Eptesicus fuscus (Abaco, New Providence, Andros, Great Exuma, Little Exuma, Crooked Island, Acklin's Island, Long Island, San Salvador)
Erophylla sezekorni (Great Abaco, Eleuthera, Long Island, Cat Island, Great Exuma, Little Exuma, San Salvador, Crooked Island, Acklin's Island, Great Inagua, Andros, Mayaguana, New Providence)
Lasiurus minor (Andros)
Lonchorhina aurita (New Providence, dubious)
Macrotus waterhousii (Abaco, Andros, New Providence, Great Exuma, Great Inagua, Cat Island, Long Island)
Monophyllus redmani (Abaco, Andros, New Providence; extirpated)
Mormoops blainvillei (Abaco, Exuma, New Providence; extirpated)
Mormoops megalophylla (Abaco, Andros; extirpated)
Myotis cf. austroriparius (Abaco; extirpated)
Natalus primus (Abaco, Andros, New Providence; extirpated)
Noctilio leporinus (Great Inagua)
Nyctiellus lepidus (Long Island, Cat Island, Little Exuma, Eleuthera; extirpated on Andros)
Phyllonycteris poeyi (Abaco, New Providence; extirpated)
Pteronotus macleayii (New Providence, extirpated)
Pteronotus parnellii (Abaco, New Providence; extirpated)
Pteronotus quadridens (Abaco, Andros, New Providence; extirpated)
Tadarida brasiliensis (Little Exuma, Abaco; extirpated on New Providence)

Turks and Caicos Islands
The Turks and Caicos Islands are a group of British islands east of the Bahamas.
Brachyphylla nana (Grand Caicos)
Erophylla sezekorni (three of the Caicos Islands, including East Caicos and Grand Caicos)
Lasiurus minor (Caicos Islands, precise locality unknown)
Macrotus waterhousii (Grand Caicos; extirpated)
Monophyllus redmani (Grand Caicos)
Natalus major (Grand Caicos; extirpated)
Tadarida brasiliensis (Grand Caicos; extirpated)

Cozumel
Cozumel is a large island near the mainland of the Mexican state of Quintana Roo. In addition to the species listed here, Centurio senex, a species of Corynorhinus (possibly C. mexicanus), Glossophaga soricina, Mimon cozumelae, and Molossus rufus have also been mentioned for the island, but the specimens these records were based on may have come from mainland Mexico instead.
Artibeus jamaicensis
Artibeus lituratus
Artibeus phaeotis
Eumops bonariensis
Lasiurus blossevillii
Micronycteris schmidtorum
Natalus mexicanus
Nyctinomops laticaudatus
Pteronotus parnellii

Lighthouse Reef
Lighthouse Reef is a coral atoll off Belize.
Artibeus jamaicensis (Half Moon Caye)

Roatán
Roatán is a Honduran island in the southern Caribbean.
Artibeus jamaicensis
Glossophaga soricina
Molossus molossus
Saccopteryx bilineata

San Andrés
San Andrés is a Colombian island, part of the department of San Andrés, Providencia and Santa Catalina, isolated in the southwestern Caribbean.
Artibeus jamaicensis

Providencia
Providencia, also known as Old Providence, is another Colombian island in the San Andrés, Providencia and Santa Catalina department.
Artibeus jamaicensis
Chilonatalus micropus

Escudo de Veraguas
Escudo de Veraguas is a small island off northwestern Panama. Despite the fact that it has been isolated from the mainland for only 9000 years, it supports at least two mammals that occur nowhere else, including the bat Dermanura watsoni incomitata and a sloth, Bradypus pygmaeus. Several other mammals on the island also differ from mainland forms.
Carollia brevicauda
Dermanura watsoni incomitata
Glossophaga soricina
Micronycteris megalotis
Myotis riparius
Saccopteryx leptura

Isla Margarita
Isla Margarita is the largest island of Venezuela. Like Trinidad and Tobago, Isla Margarita is a land-bridge island with a relatively diverse bat fauna.
Desmodus rotundus
Diaemus youngi
Glossophaga longirostris
Glossophaga soricina
Leptonycteris curasoae
Micronycteris megalotis
Molossus molossus
Mormoops megalophylla
Peropteryx trinitatis
Phyllostomus discolor
Phyllostomus hastatus
Pteronotus parnellii
Saccopteryx leptura

See also

List of North American bats
List of Mexican bats
List of Central American bats
List of South American bats

References

Literature cited
Anderson, R.P. and Handley, C.O., Jr. (2001). "A new species of three-toed sloth (Mammalia: Xenarthra) from Panama, with a review of the genus Bradypus". Proceedings of the Biological Society of Washington. 114: 1–33.
Baird, A.B., Hillis, D.M., Patton, J.C. and Bickham, J.W. (2008). "Evolutionary history of the genus Rhogeessa (Chiroptera: Vespertilionidae) as revealed by mitochondrial DNA sequences". Journal of Mammalogy. 89 (3): 744–754.
Bakker, J.P. (1999). "The mammals of Aruba". Mededeling 46 van de Vereniging voor Zoogdierkunde en Zoogdierbescherming. (in Dutch).
Engstrom, M.D., Schmidt, C.A., Morales, J.C. and Dowler, R.C. (1989). "Records of mammals from Isla Cozumel, Quintana Roo, Mexico". The Southwestern Naturalist. 34 (3): 413–415.
Escobedo-Cabrera, E., León-Paniagua, L. and Arroyo-Cabrales, J. (2006). "Geographic distribution and some taxonomic comments of Micronycteris schmidtorum Sanborn (Chiroptera: Phyllostomidae) in Mexico". Caribbean Journal of Science. 42 (1): 129–135.
Gardner, A.L. (ed.) (2007). Mammals of South America. Volume 1: Marsupials, xenarthrans, shrews, and bats. University of Chicago Press. 
Geluso, K., Harner, M.J., Lemen, C.A. and Freeman, P.W. (2009). "A survey of bats in northern Trinidad late in the rainy season". Occasional Papers, Museum of Texas Tech University. 285: 1–13.
Genoways, H.H. (1998). "Two new subspecies of bats of the genus Sturnira from the Lesser Antilles, West Indies". Occasional Papers, Museum of Texas Tech University. 176: 1–7.
Genoways, H.H., Phillips, C.J. and Baker, R.J. (1998). "Bats of the Antillean island of Grenada: a new zoogeographic perspective". Occasional Papers, Museum of Texas Tech University. 177: 1–28.
Genoways, H.H., Baker, R.J., Bickham, J.W. and Phillips, C.J. (2005). "Bats of Jamaica". Special Publications, Museum of Texas Tech University. 48: 1–154.
Genoways, H.H., Pedersen, S.C., Phillips, C.J. and Gordon, L.K. (2007a). "Bats of Anguilla, northern Lesser Antilles". Occasional Papers, Texas Tech University. 270:1–12.
Genoways, H.H., Larsen, P.A., Pedersen, S.C. and Huebschman, J.J. (2007b). "Bats of Saba, Netherlands Antilles: a zoogeographic perspective". Acta Chiropterologica. 9 (1): 97–114.
Genoways, H.H., Pedersen, S.C., Larsen, P.A., Kwiecinski, G.G. and Huebschman, J.J. (2007c). "Bats of Saint Martin, French West Indies/Sint Maarten, Netherlands Antilles". Mastozoología Neotropical. 14 (2): 169–188.
Goodwin, G.G. and Greenhall, A.M. (1961). "A review of the bats of Trinidad and Tobago: descriptions, rabies infection, and ecology". Bulletin of the American Museum of Natural History. 122 (3): 191–301.
Greenhall, Arthur M. (1961). Bats in Agriculture. Ministry of Agriculture. Trinidad and Tobago.
Hall, E.R. (1981). The Mammals of North America. 2 volumes. Ronald Press.
IUCN. (2009). IUCN Red List of Threatened Species. Version 2009.1.
Jones, J.K., Jr., and Lawlor, T.E. (1965). "Mammals from Isla Cozumel, México, with description of a new species of harvest mouse". University of Kansas Publications, Museum of Natural History. 16: 409–419.
Kalko, E.K.V. and Handley, C.E. (1994). "Evolution, biogeography, and description of a new species of fruit-eating bat, genus Artibeus Leach (1821), from Panamá". Zeitschrift für Säugetierkunde. 59: 257–273.
Koopman, K.F. (1959). "The zoogeographical limits of the West Indies". Journal of Mammalogy. 40 (2): 236–240.
Kwiecinski, G.G. and Coles, W.C. (2007). "Presence of Stenoderma rufum beyond the Puerto Rican Bank". Occasional Papers, Museum of Texas Tech University. 266: 1–9.
Larsen, P.A., Genoways, H.H. and Pedersen, S.C. (2006). "New records of bats from Saint Barthélemy, French West Indies". Mammalia. 70 (3–4): 321–325.
Larsen, P.A., Hoofer, S.R., Bozeman, M.C., Pedersen, S.C., Genoways, H.H., Phillips, C.J., Pumo, D.E. and Baker, R.J. (2007). "Phylogenetics and phylogeography of the Artibeus jamaicensis complex based on cytochrome-b DNA sequences". Journal of Mammalogy. 88 (3): 712–727.
Larsen, R.J., Boegler, K.A., Genoways, H.H., Masefield, W.P., Kirsch, R.A. and Pedersen, S.C. (2007). "Mist netting bias, species accumulation curves, and the rediscovery of two bats on Montserrat (Lesser Antilles)". Acta Chiropterologica. 9 (2): 423–435.
Larsen, R.J., Larsen, P.A., Genoways, H.H., Catzeflis, F.M., Geluso, K., Kwiecinski, G.G., Pedersen, S.C., Simal, F. and Baker, R.J. (2012). "Evolutionary history of Caribbean species of Myotis, with evidence of a third Lesser Antillean endemic". Mammalian Biology. 77: 124–134.
Lazell, J. (1989). Wildlife of the Florida Keys: A Natural History. Island Press 
Mancina, C.A. (2005). "Pteronotus macleayii". Mammalian Species. 778: 1–3.
Mancina, C.A. and García-Rivera, L. (2005). "New genus and species of fossil bat (Chiroptera: Phyllostomidae) from Cuba". Caribbean Journal of Science. 41 (1): 22–27.
McDonough, M.M., Ammerman, L.K., Timm, R.M., Genoways, H.H., Larsen, P.A. and Baker, R.J. (2008). "Speciation within bonneted bats (genus Eumops): The complexity of morphological, mitochondrial, and nuclear data sets in systematics". Journal of Mammalogy. 89 (5): 1306–1315.

Morgan, G.S. (1994a). "Mammals of the Cayman Islands". pp. 435–463 in Brunt, M.A. and Davies, J.E. (eds.). The Cayman Islands: Natural History and Biogeography. Springer. 
Morgan, G.S. (1994b). "Late Quaternary fossil vertebrates from the Cayman Islands". pp. 465–508 in Brunt, M.A. and Davies, J.E. (eds.). The Cayman Islands: Natural History and Biogeography. Springer. 
Morgan, G.S. (2001). "Patterns of extinction in West Indian bats". pp. 369–407 in Woods, C.A. and Sergile, F.E. (eds.). Biogeography of the West Indies: Patterns and Perspectives. CRC Press, Boca Raton, Florida.
Morgan, G.S. and Woods, C.A. (1986). "Extinction and the zoogeography of West Indian land mammals". Biological Journal of the Linnean Society. 28: 167–203.
Pedersen, S.C., Genoways, H.H. and Freeman, P.W. (1996). "Notes on bats from Montserrat (Lesser Antilles) with comments concerning the effects of hurricane Hugo". Caribbean Journal of Science. 32 (2): 206–213.
Pedersen, S.C., Genoways, H.H., Morton, M.N., Johnson, J.W. and Courts, S.E. (2003). "Bats of Nevis, northern Lesser Antilles". Acta Chiropterologica. 5 (2): 251–267.
Pedersen, S.C., Genoways, H.H., Morton, M.N., Kwiecinski, G.G. and Courts, S.E. (2005). "Bats of St. Kitts (St. Christopher), northern Lesser Antilles, with comments regarding capture rates of Neotropical bats". Caribbean Journal of Science. 41 (4): 744–760.
Pedersen, S.C., Genoways, H.H., Morton, M.N., Swier, V.J., Larsen, P.A., Lindsay, K.C., Adams, R.A. and Appino, J.D. (2006). "Bats of Antigua, northern Lesser Antilles". Occasional Papers, Museum of Texas Tech University. 249: 1–18.
Pedersen, S.C., Larsen, P.A., Genoways, H.H., Morton, M.N., Lindsay, K.C. and Cindric, J. (2007). "Bats of Barbuda, northern Lesser Antilles". Occasional Papers, Texas Tech University. 271: 1–19.
Petit, S. (1996). "The status of bats on Curaçao". Biological Conservation. 77: 27–31.
Simmons, N.B. (2005). "Order Chiroptera". pp. 312–529 in Wilson, D.E. and Reeder, D.M. (eds.). [http://www.bucknell.edu/msw3 Mammal Species of the World: A Taxonomic and Geographic Reference]. 3rd ed. Baltimore: The Johns Hopkins University Press, 2 vols.. 
Suárez, W. (2005). "Taxonomic status of the Cuban vampire bat (Chiroptera: Phyllostomidae: Desmodontinae: Desmodus)". Caribbean Journal of Science. 41 (4): 761–767.
Suárez, W. and Díaz-Franco, S. (2003). "A new fossil bat (Chiroptera: Phyllostomidae) from a Quaternary cave deposit in Cuba". Caribbean Journal of Science. 39 (3): 371–377.
Tavares, V. da. C. and Mancina, C.A. (2008). "Phyllops falcatus (Chiroptera: Phyllostomidae)". Mammalian Species. 811: 1–7.
Tejedor, A., Tavares, V. da C. and Silva-Taboada, G. (2005). "A revision of extant Greater Antillean bats of the genus Natalus". American Museum Novitates. 3493: 1–22.
Tejedor, A. (2006). "The type locality of Natalus stramineus (Chiroptera: Natalidae): implications for the taxonomy and biogeography of the genus Natalus". Acta Chiropterologica. 8 (2): 361–380.
Timm, R.M. and Genoways, H.H. (2003). "West Indian mammals from the Albert Schwartz collection: Biological and historical information". Scientific Papers, Natural History Museum, University of Kansas. 29: 1–47.
Whitaker, J.O. and Hamilton, W.J. (1998). Mammals of the Eastern United States. Cornell University Press. 

 Island